Vanaheimr is a location in Norse mythology.

Vanaheim may also refer to:
Vanaheim (Conan), a nation in the fictional world of Conan the Barbarian
Aardvark-Vanaheim, a Canadian comic book company
Vanaheim (band), a Norwegian musical group
Vanheimr (song), a song by Danheim for his album Mannavegr